Yalnız can refer to:

 Yalnız, Elâzığ
 Yalnız, Merzifon